The 2018–19 Army Black Knights men's basketball team represented the United States Military Academy during the 2018–19 NCAA Division I men's basketball season. The Black Knights were led by third-year head coach Jimmy Allen, and played their home games at Christl Arena in West Point, New York as members of the Patriot League. They finished the season 13–19 overall, 8–10 in Patriot League play to finish in a tie for fifth place. As the No. 6 seed in the Patriot League tournament, they lost in the quarterfinals to Lehigh.

Previous season
The Black Knights finished the 2017–18 season 13–17, 6–12 in Patriot League play to finish in a tie for eighth place. They lost in the first round of the Patriot League tournament to Loyola (MD).

Offseason

Departures

2018 recruiting class

2019 recruiting class

Roster

Schedule and results

|-
!colspan=9 style=| Non-conference regular season

|-
!colspan=9 style=| Patriot League regular season

|-
!colspan=9 style=| Patriot League tournament

Source

References

Army Black Knights men's basketball seasons
Army
Army Black Knights men's basketball
Army Black Knights men's basketball